The Macedonian Committee (Makedoniko Komitato), formally the Hellenic Macedonian Committee (Ελληνομακεδονικό Κομιτάτο, Ellinomakedoniko Komitato), was a Greek revolutionary organization with the aim of liberating Macedonia from the Ottoman Empire (in the vilayets of Monastir and Salonika).

Creation of the committee 

Despite the prior existence of Greek armed bands in the region of Ottoman Macedonia, it wasn't until 1900 when Stefanos Dragoumis founded the Hellenic Macedonian Committee, that an organized and coordinated effort was undertaken. The committee was led by the wealthy publisher Dimitrios Kalapothakis and its members included Greek aristocrats, politicians, and other Greek notables in addition to the guerrilla fighters. This included individuals such as Ion Dragoumis, Pavlos Melas, etc. 
The Hellenic Macedonian Committee served as the Greek answer to the IMRO following their increase in hostilities towards the Greek inhabitants of Macedonia. It also acted as the enforcement arm of the Greek Patriarchate, to contain and prevent further expansion of the Bulgarian Exarchate in the region. The committee took charge of the organization of guerrilla fighters in Macedonia—the Makedonomachoi—during the Macedonian Struggle (1904–1908).

Role in the Macedonian Struggle 
Following the establishment of the Bulgarian Exarchate, Greeks and Bulgarians were engaged in a propaganda struggle for the allegiance of the inhabitants of Macedonia. Following the abortive Ilinden Uprising in August 1903 by the Bulgarian-sponsored IMRO, the Macedonian Committee organized to protect the Greek Macedonians and preserve Greek interests in the region. Nikolaos Mavrokordatos, the ambassador of Greece, with the consul of Greece in Monastir, Ion Dragoumis, agreed to send Germanos Karavangelis to Macedonia as the Bishop of Kastoria. It was there that he realised the urgency of the situation and began the more efficient organisation of the Greek opposition. While Dragoumis concerned himself with the financial organisation of the efforts, the central figure in the military struggle was the capable Cretan officer Georgios Katechakis. Bishop Germanos Karavangelis would travel to raise morale and encourage the Macedonian Greek population to take action against the IMRO. He was also instrumental in the formation of various committees to promote Greek national interests.

Katechakis and Karavangelis succeeded in organizing and coordinating local guerrilla groups, occasionally recruiting former IMRO members who had political and/or personal disputes within the organisation (ex. Kottas Christou, Gonos Yiotas, etc.). The armed bands were later reinforced with volunteers from free Greece, many from Crete and the Mani area of the Peloponnese. Many ex-officers of the Hellenic Army were encouraged to volunteer to provide experienced leadership and a logistical advantage, and many ultimately did. Macedonian Greeks, however, formed the core of the fighting force and proved the most important due to their extensive geographic knowledge of the region as well as a number of them possessing varying degrees of knowledge of the Bulgarian language. Many Macedonian Greeks distinguished themselves as effective chieftains and experts of unconventional warfare, such as Evangelos Natsis, Dimitrios Stagas, Georgios Savvas, Michael Sionidis, Ioannis Ramnalis, Petros Christou, Antigonos Choleris, Christos Stogiannidis, Periklis Drakos, Pavlos Rakovitis, Georgios Seridis, Iraklis Patikas and many more. The rebel fighters who fought for the Greek cause came to be known by the Greeks as Makedonomachoi ("Macedonian fighters").

Greek writer Penelope Delta portrayed the Makedonomachoi in her novel Τά μυστικά τοῦ Βάλτου (Ta Mystiká tou Váltou – The Secrets of the Swamp), and Germanos Karavangelis recalls them in his book of memoirs Ὁ Μακεδονικός Ἀγών (The Macedonian Struggle). Comparatively, the Komitadjis of the IMRO and their activities appear in the book Confessions of a Macedonian Bandit: A Californian in the Balkan Wars, written by Albert Sonnichsen, an American volunteer in the IMRO during the Macedonian Struggle.

Sources
 Karavangelis, Germanos: "The Macedonian Struggle" (Memoirs)
 Dakin, Douglas: "The Greek Struggle in Macedonia 1897–1913", 1993 
 Rappoport, Alfred: Au pays des martyrs. Notes et souvenirs d'un ancien consul-général d'Autriche-Hongrie en Macédoine (1904–1909). Librarie Universitaire J. Gamber, Paris, 1927. Memoirs of the General Consul of Austro-Hungary in Macedonia. Cat. No. 7029530203814.
Livanios, D., 1999. ‘Conquering the souls’: nationalism and Greek guerrilla warfare in Ottoman Macedonia, 1904–1908. Byzantine and Modern Greek Studies, 23, pp. 195–221.

References 

Macedonian Struggle
Macedonia under the Ottoman Empire
Greek revolutionary organizations
Revolutionary organizations against the Ottoman Empire
National liberation movements
History of Greece (1863–1909)
1903 establishments in Greece